Dhool Khurd (دھول خورد) /du:l hɔ:rd/  is a village located in the Gujrat District of Punjab, Pakistan, about 6 km northeast of Gujrat city. It is situated on the Dinga-Gujrat road, near the Bhimber creek, with the Lahore-Islamabad G.T road only 1 km away. The village was named after the Dhool clan of Jats, who are one of several clans living there. Other clans include Jat Aaran, Jat Khokhar, Jat Virk, Jat Gondal, and a large number of non-agriculturalists. Dhool Khurd is part of the Aadowal union council and has a strong political background. Many people from Dhool Khurd have settled abroad in countries such as Saudi Arabia, UAE, UK, Europe, Canada, and Australia, and operate their own businesses in various fields such as trade, construction, transport, real estate, and engineering. The village is also known for having the highest number of employees working for WAPDA (Water and Power Development Authority). The literacy rate in Dhool Khurd is higher than in neighboring villages, and the village has a population of approximately 4000 people, belonging to over 300 families.

Aerial views of Dhool Khurd

Neighbouring villages
Rahmania 
Dheru Ghuna
Sahanwal
Shahabdiwal
Changanwali
Wains

Schools
Government Boys  Primary School Dhool Khurd

Government Girls Primary School Dhool Khurd

Government Girls High School Dhool Khurd

Populated places in Gujrat District